Massachusetts House of Representatives' 18th Suffolk district in the United States is one of 160 legislative districts included in the lower house of the Massachusetts General Court. It covers part of the city of Boston in Suffolk County and part of Brookline in Norfolk County. Since 2005, Michael J. Moran of the Democratic Party has represented the district.

The current district geographic boundary overlaps with those of the Massachusetts Senate's 1st Middlesex and Norfolk district, Middlesex and Suffolk district, and 2nd Suffolk and Middlesex district.

Representatives
 Ralph E. Sirianni, Jr.
 John J. Finnegan
 John F. Melia
 Thomas M. Gallagher
 Kevin G. Honan
 Steven A. Tolman
 Brian Paul Golden
 Michael J. Moran, 2005-current

See also
 List of Massachusetts House of Representatives elections
 List of Massachusetts General Courts
 Other Suffolk County districts of the Massachusetts House of Representatives: 1st, 2nd, 3rd, 4th, 5th, 6th, 7th, 8th, 9th, 10th, 11th, 12th, 13th, 14th, 15th, 16th, 17th, 19th
 List of former districts of the Massachusetts House of Representatives

Images
Portraits of legislators

References

External links
 Ballotpedia
  (State House district information based on U.S. Census Bureau's American Community Survey).

House
Government of Suffolk County, Massachusetts
Government of Norfolk County, Massachusetts